The Hersey River is a  stream in the Lower Peninsula of the U.S. state of Michigan. For approximately the first two miles, the river flows southward just east of U.S. Route 131. US 131 crosses the river near the northern boundary of Richmond Township. The river continues southward into Lake No Sho Mo, formed by a dam just south of Nartron Field airport. The river continues southward under U.S. Route 10 into Reed City and turns to the east, continuing southeastward into the village of Hersey, where it empties into the Muskegon River at Blodgett's Landing Campground.

Named tributaries 
From the mouth:
 (left) Johnson Creek
 (right) Hewitt Creek
 (left) Knuth Creek
 (left) Jewitt Creek
 (right) Lawrence Creek
 (right) Lincoln Creek
 Lincoln Lake
 Todd Lake
 Indian Creek
 Johnson Creek
 Beaver Dam Lake
 (right) East Branch Hersey Creek
 (right) Olson Creek
 Sherwood Lake
 Sprague Lake
 (right) Twin Creek
 Twin Lake
 (left) Hersey Creek
 (left) Burt Creek
 (left) Kissinger Creek

Drainage basin 
The drainage basin includes all or portions of the following townships and municipalities:
 Osceola County
 Cedar Township
 Hersey
 Hersey Township
 Le Roy Township
 Lincoln Township
 Reed City
 Richmond Township
 Rose Lake Township
 Lake County
 Chase Township
 Ellsworth Township
 Pinora Township

See also
List of rivers of Michigan

References

Rivers of Osceola County, Michigan
Rivers of Michigan
Tributaries of Lake Michigan